Menaul School is an independent sixth through twelfth grade day and boarding school in Albuquerque, New Mexico with a diverse, intellectual, personal, college preparatory education experience.  Menaul School is accredited by the State of New Mexico, Independent Schools Association of the Southwest (ISAS) and North Central Association (NCA). The school has strong historical significance in New Mexico, and especially in Albuquerque, where Menaul Blvd. and many other locations have been named for the school.

History 

Although the roots of Menaul School go back to 1881, when Rev. Sheldon Jackson, a Presbyterian minister, opened "The Pueblo Training School" (PTS) in Albuquerque, NM under a contract with the U.S. government, that did not mark the founding of Menaul School.

Instead, it marked the establishment of Presbyterian-related education in Albuquerque. The PTS was originally located in the Duranes area, just north of Old Town in Albuquerque. In 1882, the government purchased 66.67 acres of land from citizens of Albuquerque. (This is the property at what is now Indian School Road and 12th Street.) In 1884, the school moved into buildings at that location.

In 1886, the Commissioner of Indian Affairs did not renew the contract with the Presbyterians and took over the PTS facilities. The Presbyterians decided there was still need for a boarding school and so, in 1896, Rev. James A. Menaul, a Presbyterian minister, sought and received Presbyterian mission funding for a boarding school that would serve Spanish-speaking boys from New Mexico, primarily from the northern portion of the state, and purchased some 200 acres at the present Menaul School location.

Many students came to Menaul School from Northern New Mexico and Southern Colorado, where public education was nearly non-existent in those early days. It was not unusual for parents to contribute to their children's education with grain or livestock. The livestock were in turn used on the school's farm, which kept the students well fed.

In 1972, the Presbyterian Church relinquished control over and financing of Menaul School to an independent and volunteer Board of Trustees. Though the school remains related to the Presbyterian Church, its only major support from the national organization comes from the church-wide annual Christmas Joy Offering collected each December.

The grades taught at Menaul School have fluctuated from primary school to high school throughout the school's history. The first students to graduate from Menaul School comprised the Class of 1906. In 1934, Menaul School became co-educational. Today, Menaul School is an independent school for grades 6 through 12. (A full middle school program was added in 1992.)

Academics 

The student to teacher ratio is 7:1

Menaul School is accredited by the State of New Mexico, Independent Schools Association of the Southwest (ISAS) and North Central Association (NCA).

Athletics 

Senior high level sports open to 8th - 12th grades.
Separate middle school programs (6 - 8) provided in selected sports.
Opportunities exist for involvement of motivated students regardless of previous experience, skill level, and size.
There is a student conduct policy. Sports programs welcome athletes and managers.
Student interest drives program offerings.

Visual and performing arts

Extracurricular activities 

Students participate in a variety of sports at Menaul School, including football, soccer, volleyball, basketball and track and field.

Students participate in organizations such as Student Council and Model UN, and clubs such as Junior Civitan, Garden Club, Art Club, French Club, Tribe, and Robotics Club.

External links
Menaul School Homepage

High schools in Albuquerque, New Mexico
Private high schools in New Mexico
Independent Schools Association of the Southwest
1896 establishments in New Mexico Territory